Barolineocerus declivus is a species of leafhopper native to French Guiana. It is named for the protrusions from the male anal tube being
bent downward.  It is distinguished from other species in the genus by the protrusions of the male anal tube and the plain reproductive organ.

References

Insects described in 2008
Hemiptera of South America
Eurymelinae